Francis L. Delmonico, MD, FACS (born in New York in 1945) is a surgeon, clinical professor and health expert in the field of transplantation. He serves on numerous committees and is affiliated with various leading organizations and institutions. He is the chief medical officer of the New England Organ Bank (NEOB) and Professor of Surgery, Part-Time at Harvard Medical School in Boston, Massachusetts, where he is emeritus director of renal transplantation. He served as president of The Transplantation Society (TTS) from 2012 to 2014, an international non-profit organization based in Montreal, Canada that works with international transplantation physicians and researchers. He also served as the president of the United Network of Organ Sharing (UNOS) in 2005, which overseas the practice of organ donation and transplantation in the United States. He was appointed and still serves as an advisor to the World Health Organization in matters of organ donation and transplantation. He was appointed by Pope Francis to the Pontifical Academy of Science in 2016. In 2020, he became the recipient of the Medawar Prize of The Transplantation Society.

Education
Delmonico received a Bachelor of Science degree in biology at Mount Saint Mary's College in 1966 and a Doctor of Medicine degree from George Washington University in 1971. His initial general surgical training was under the direction of pioneer transplant surgeon Dr. David Hume at the Medical College of Virginia. In 1974, Delmonico interrupted his general surgical training to complete a two-year Clinical and Research Fellowship in Transplantation at the Massachusetts General Hospital. He then returned to the Medical College of Virginia to continue his general surgical residency training, which he completed in 1978 as chief resident in surgery.

After serving for two years in the United States Navy as a staff surgeon at Walter Reed Medical Center, an assistant professor of surgery at the Uniformed Services University School of Medicine, and as ship's surgeon on the USS Independence, Delmonico was recruited to the Massachusetts General Hospital in 1980 as a member of the transplantation unit of the department of surgery. He was promoted to visiting surgeon in 1997 and to professor of surgery at the Harvard Medical School in 2000. From 1990 until 2004 he was the director of the Renal Transplantation Service at the Massachusetts General Hospital. Throughout his time at Mass General, he has devoted most of his research efforts to clinical investigation. In the early part of his career, he focused upon the management of recipient immunosuppression and more recently upon the clinical parameters that define the suitable organ donor.

In 1995, Delmonico was appointed medical director of the New England Organ Bank (NEOB). Under his direction, the NEOB has undertaken several research projects, most notably an outcome study of organs transplanted from deceased donors who were bacteremic at the time of their death. This study removed a heretofore absolute contraindication to organ donation, thereby expanding the organ donor pool for selected allograft recipients. Another focus of Delmonico's organ donor interest has been the concept of death. He has been responsible for the development of the Donation after Cardiac Death initiative in transplant centers who are members of the NEOB. He was awarded a Department of Health and Human Services Grant as the principal investigator of a project to study the acceptance of kidneys recovered from deceased expanded criteria donors and has served as the medical advisor to the Association of Organ Procurement Organizations.

Writings
He has authored or co-authored more than 260 publications, either as original articles, reviews, commentaries or book chapters. His original writings have been published in the New England Journal of Medicine, the Journal of the American Medical Association and The New York Times. He has appeared on numerous television and radio programs, including Nightline, Good Morning America, CBS Sunday Morning America and NPR news. Other educational achievements include his work as associate editor of the American Journal of Transplantation and his reviews for many medical journals such as the Journal of the American Medical Association, the Journal of the American Association of Nephrology, and Surgery. He is a member of the editorial board of Transplantation, Kidney International and Clinical Transplantation.

Delmonico has served on the board of trustees and numerous committees of the United Network for Organ Sharing (UNOS). UNOS is the contractor for the Organ Procurement and Transplant Network (OPTN), the federally designated organization that oversees the practice of transplantation in the United States. He is a past-president of the OPTN/UNOS.

The Transplantation Society
His contributions to The Transplantation Society (TTS) have been long-standing. As chairman of TTS's ethics committee, he convened an international forum on the live kidney donor in Amsterdam, Netherlands, in April 2004, and on the liver lung, liver, intestine and pancreas donor in Vancouver, Canada, in September 2005, with participation of over 100 physicians and surgeons from 44 countries around the world. Furthermore, he served as TTS's director of medical affairs from 2006 to 2010 and president from 2012 to 2014. He is now the immediate past president and will remain so until August 2016.  He works closely with the World Health Organization who made him a WHO consultant on matter of human organ donation and transplantation. These appointments constitute the major aspect of his current efforts. In 2008, he was responsible for convening the Istanbul Summit from which the Declaration of Istanbul on Organ Trafficking and Transplant Tourism was derived. He became executive director the Declaration of Istanbul Custodian Group in 2015.

Publications
 Delmonico FL and Dew MA. Living donor kidney transplantation in a global environment. Kidney Int. 2007 7:608-14.
 Dew MA, Jacobs CL, Jowsey SG, Hanto R, Miller C, Delmonico FL. Guidelines for the psychosocial evaluation of living unrelated kidney donors in the United States. Am J Transplant. 2007 5:1047-54.
 Schulz-Baldes A, Delmonico FL. Improving institutional fairness to live kidney donors: donor needs must be addressed by safeguarding donation risks and compensating donation costs. Transpl Int. 2007 11:940-6.
 DuBois JM, Delmonico FL, D'Alessandro AM. When organ donors are still patients: is premortem use of heparin ethically acceptable? Am J Crit Care. 2007 4:396-400.
 Saidi RF, Elias N, Kawai T, Hertl M, Farrell ML, Goes N, Wong W, Hartono C, Fishman JA, Kotton CN, Tolkoff-Rubin N, Delmonico FL, Cosimi AB, and Ko DS.
Outcome of kidney transplantation using expanded criteria donors and donation after cardiac death kidneys: realities and costs. Am J Transplant. 2007 12:2769-74.
 Sung RS, Christensen LL, Leichtman AB, Greenstein SM, Distant DA, Wynn JJ, Stegall MD, Delmonico FL, Port FK.  Determinants of discard of expanded criteria donor kidneys: impact of biopsy and machine perfusion.  Am J Transplant. 2008 8(4):783-92.
 Tsoulfas G, Hertl M, Ko DS, Elias N, Delmonico FL, Romano L, Fernandes I, Schoenfeld D, Kawai T.  Long-term Outcome of a Cuffed Expanded PTFE Graft for Hemodialysis Vascular Access.  World J Surg. 2008 32(8):1827-31
 Saidi RF, Wertheim JA, Ko DS, Elias N, Martin H, Delmonico FL, Cosimi AB, Kawai T. Impact of donor kidney recovery method on lymphatic complications in kidney transplantation. Transplant Proc. 2008 40(4):1054–1055.
 Delmonico FL.  The Development of the Declaration of Istanbul on Organ Trafficking and Transplant Tourism. Nephrology Dialysis Transplantation 2008(23): 3381–3382.
 Gritsch HA, Veale JL, Leichtman AB, Guidinger MK, Magee JC, McDonald RA, Harmon WE, Delmonico FL, Ettenger RB, Cecka JM. Should pediatric patients wait for HLA-DR-matched renal transplants? Am J Transplant. 2008 8(10):2056-61.
 Delmonico FL, McBride MA. Analysis of the wait list and deaths among candidates waiting for a kidney transplant. Transplantation. 2008 86(12):1678-83.
 Hanto RL, Reitsma W, Delmonico FL. The development of a successful multiregional kidney paired donation program. Transplantation. 2008 86(12):1744–1748
 Tilney N, Murray J, Thistlethwaite R, Norman D, Delmonico F, Hanto D, Leichtman A, Danovitch G, Sayegh M, Shapiro R, Harmon W, Salvatierra O, Brennan D, McDiarmid S, Stock P, Pomfret L, Bennett W, Conti D, Metzger B, Sarwal M, Cosimi AB.  Promotion of altruistic donation. Transplantation. 2009 Sep 27;88(6):847.
 Humar, A., Morris, M., Blumberg, E., Freeman, R., Preikaitis, J. Kiberd, B., Schweitzer, E., Ganz, S., Caliendo, A., Orlowski, J.P., Wilson, B., Kotton, C., Michaels, M., Kleinman, S., Greier, S., Murphy, B., Green, M., Levi, M., Knoll, G., Segev, D., Brubaker, S., Hasz, R., Lebovitz, D.J., Mulligan, D., O'Connor, K., Pruett, T., Mozes, M., Lee, I., Delmonico, F.L., Fischer, S.  Nucleic acid testing (NAT) or organ donors: is the 'best' test the right test? A consensus conference report.  Am. J. Transplant. 2010 Apr;10(4):889-99. Epub 2010 Jan 29. Review.
 Costa. A.N., Simon i Castellvi, J.M., Spagnolo, A.G., Comoretto, N., Laffitte, J., Gabel, H., Delmonico, F.L., Muehlbacher, F., Schaupp, W., Glazier, A.K., Garcia, V.D., Abbud-Fiho, M., Medina-Pestana, J.O., Grainer, M.G., Donadio, P.P., Guermani, A., Bosco, R., Giordano, F., Martinez Lopez de Arroyabe, B., Brunetti, M., Manyalich, M.., Paez, G., Valero, R., Matesanz, R., Coll, E., Dominguez-Gil, B., Mahillo, B., Escobar, E.M., Garrido, G., Cantarovich, F.  Transplantation. 2009 Oct 15:88(7 Suppl):S108-58.

References

External links
 http://www.unos.org/
 http://www.tts.org/
 http://neob.org/
 https://web.archive.org/web/20101127041644/http://hms.harvard.edu/hms/home.asp
 http://www.americansurgical.info/ 
 http://www.kidney.org/about/board.cfm
 https://query.nytimes.com/gst/fullpage.html?res=9F0CEFDD1231F936A25751C1A9609C8B63

Living people
Harvard Medical School faculty
American transplant surgeons
1945 births
George Washington University School of Medicine & Health Sciences alumni
People from Queens, New York
Medical College of Virginia alumni